Mad Apple is a Cirque du Soleil contemporary circus at the New York-New York Hotel and Casino in Las Vegas.

Critical reception
The Los Angeles Times wrote "The stage production, which has been taking rapt audiences through a fantastical night on the town in New York City, is at once familiar and groundbreaking, with several features never-before seen in Cirque du Soleil performances, including stand-up comedy."

The Las Vegas Review-Journal said "“Mad Apple” is not the Cirque we’ve come to know over the years, and that’s all right from here. It’s a good time with a fresh and fun cast. You’ll walk out impressed at all the thought and talent Cirque packs into a show, and that’s what it’s all about."

References

External links

Cirque du Soleil shows